Sicco Polenton (1375–1447) was an Italian jurist, Neolatin author, and Renaissance humanist.

Sicco Ricci (Rizzi) was born at Levico Terme in either 1375 or 1376. He took the name "Polenton" (Polentonus) from his father Bartolomeo. He studied grammar and rhetoric at Padua under Giovanni Conversini and periodically with Vittorino da Feltre. At the age of twenty he began his career as a public notary, which carried with it, for a brief spell, the prestige of the office of chancellor of the Comune.

In 1408 Sicco married Antonia Enselmini and thereafter his life was devoted mostly to literary endeavours. In 1413 he completed his first Latin work, the Argumenta super aliquot orationibus et invectivis Ciceronis. In 1419 he published his most successful work, Catinia, a comedy in seven scenes. Thereafter he worked on his Scriptorum illustrium latinae linguae, the first history of the Latin language and its literature, which he had begun by 1425 but did not finish until 1437. He erroneously attributed a piece De puellis ("On girls"), perhaps De tribus puellis, to Ovid.

In 1430 Sicco retired from public life. He spent his final years writing various tracts expounding religious arguments and died in Padua in 1446 or 1447. He was buried in the church of San Leonardo, now disappeared.

Sources
Robathan, Dorothy M. (1932). "A Fifteenth-Century History of Latin Literature." Speculum, 7:2 (April), pp. 239–248.

1375 births
1447 deaths
15th-century Italian jurists
15th-century Latin writers
Italian Renaissance humanists